Lavelle may refer to:

Lavelle, Pennsylvania, a census-designated place located in Pennsylvania
 Lavelle Road, road in Bengaluru, India

Persons
 Ó Maol Fábhail (anglicised as "Lavelle"), an Irish surname
 Caroline Lavelle (b. 1969), British singer-songwriter and cellist
 Gary Lavelle (b. 1949), American baseball player
 James Lavelle (b. 1974), British DJ
 John W. Lavelle (1949–2007), American politician
 John D. Lavelle (1916–1979), American general
 Louis Lavelle (1883–1951), French philosopher
 Matt Lavelle, (b. 1970), American musician
Michael Lavelle, Michael F. Lavelle, Irish soldier, settler in India
 Peter Lavelle, TV host
 Rebecca Lavelle, Australian singer
 Rita Lavelle, American politician
 Rosanna Lavelle (b. 1979), British actress
 Rose Lavelle (b. 1995), American football player